Stokes-Evans House, also commonly known as the Harvest House Mansion, is brick structure that was built in 1842 by Isaac Stokes for his retirement, and is located in the Marlton section of Evesham Township, Burlington County, New Jersey, United States.  Three other prominent Quaker citizens of Marlton, Ezra Evans and Henry and Mark Lippincott, also owned and occupied this house. It was added to the National Register of Historic Places in 1994.

See also
National Register of Historic Places listings in Burlington County, New Jersey

References

Evesham Township, New Jersey
National Register of Historic Places in Burlington County, New Jersey
New Jersey Register of Historic Places
Houses completed in 1842
1842 establishments in New Jersey